The 2018 New Zealand Open (officially known as the Barfoot & Thompson New Zealand Open 2018 for sponsorship reasons) was a badminton tournament which took place at North Shore Events Centre in Auckland, New Zealand, from 1 to 6 May 2018 and had a total purse of $150,000.

Tournament
The 2018 New Zealand Open was the eighth tournament of the 2018 BWF World Tour and also part of the New Zealand Open championships which had been held since 1990. This tournament was organized by Badminton New Zealand and sanctioned by the BWF.

Venue
This international tournament was held at North Shore Events Centre in Auckland, New Zealand.

Point distribution
Below is the point distribution for each phase of the tournament based on the BWF points system for the BWF World Tour Super 300 event.

Prize money
The total prize money for this tournament was US$150,000. Distribution of prize money was in accordance with BWF regulations.

Men's singles

Seeds

 Lin Dan (champion)
 Jonatan Christie (final)
 B. Sai Praneeth (semi-finals)
 Hsu Jen-hao (first round)
 Sameer Verma (quarter-finals)
 Tommy Sugiarto (quarter-finals)
 Parupalli Kashyap (withdrew)
 Kantaphon Wangcharoen (quarter-finals)

Wild card
Badminton New Zealand awarded a wild card entry to Abhinav Manota of New Zealand.

Finals

Top half

Section 1

Section 2

Bottom half

Section 3

Section 4

Women's singles

Seeds

 Sayaka Takahashi (champion)
 Lee Chia-hsin (first round)
 Fitriani (second round)
 Minatsu Mitani (semi-finals)
 Neslihan Yiğit (withdrew)
 Gregoria Mariska Tunjung (quarter-finals)
 Haruko Suzuki (quarter-finals)
 Natsuki Nidaira (first round)

Wild card
Badminton New Zealand awarded a wild card entry to Sally Fu of New Zealand.

Finals

Top half

Section 1

Section 2

Bottom half

Section 3

Section 4

Men's doubles

Seeds

 Chen Hung-ling / Wang Chi-lin (champions)
 Berry Angriawan / Hardianto (final)
 Kittinupong Kedren / Dechapol Puavaranukroh (second round)
 Bodin Isara / Nipitphon Phuangphuapet (semi-finals)
 Manu Attri / B. Sumeeth Reddy (quarter-finals)
 Wahyu Nayaka / Ade Yusuf Santoso (second round)
 He Jiting / Tan Qiang (semi-finals)
 Francis Alwin / Nandagopal Kidambi (first round)

Finals

Top half

Section 1

Section 2

Bottom half

Section 3

Section 4

Women's doubles

Seeds

 Della Destiara Haris / Rizki Amelia Pradipta (quarter-finals)
 Naoko Fukuman / Kurumi Yonao (quarter-finals)
 Chow Mei Kuan / Lee Meng Yean (first round)
 Misato Aratama / Akane Watanabe (first round)

Finals

Top half

Section 1

Section 2

Bottom half

Section 3

Section 4

Mixed doubles

Seeds

Finals

Top half

Section 1

Section 2

Bottom half

Section 3

Section 4

References

External links
 Tournament Link

New Zealand Open (badminton)
New Zealand Open
Open (badminton)
New Zealand Open (badminton)